Cathalijne Hoolwerf (born 26 February 2000) is a Dutch professional racing cyclist, who currently rides for UCI Women's Continental Team . In October 2020, she rode in the 2020 Three Days of Bruges–De Panne race in Belgium.

References

External links

2000 births
Living people
Dutch female cyclists
Place of birth missing (living people)
21st-century Dutch women